Baron Frederick von Geisler (born June 5, 1982) is a Filipino actor, businessman, occasional model, resource speaker, amateur artist, and aspiring poet of German-American descent.

As a child actor and later as a teen idol, Geisler's career has been characterized by critical and popular notoriety, followed by a period of alcohol abuse and legal troubles, before a resumption of critical repute and resurgence of commercial success in middle age as a character actor. Several of Geisler's acting accolades includes winning the Best Actor award in the 4th Cinemalaya Independent Film Festival on July 20, 2008 and the 2005 PMPC Best Single Performance of an Actor in Maalaala Mo Kaya ("Would You Remember?"). Geisler's performance in the 2022 Netflix film Doll House has also earned him praise from critics, audiences, and fellow actors.

Early life
Geisler was born in Clark Air Base, Angeles City, Pampanga to Gracia Cantor Bayonito of Bicol, Philippines and Donald David Geisler Jr., a German American who was stationed at the former U.S. military base in Angeles City. His older brother Donald Geisler is a taekwondo athlete.

Career
Geisler entered show business as a child actor in 1994 when he auditioned through the phenomenal variety kiddie/teen gag show, Ang TV in his hometown in Pampanga. Years later, he became officially a part of ABS-CBN's roster of rising homegrown talents as a member of the elite Star Circle Batch 5 (1997). He was considered as one of the network's most promising young stars alongside John Lloyd Cruz and Marc Solis in the teen boy trio "Koolits", where he was once paired up with Kristine Hermosa. Geisler cites veteran Filipino actor Johnny Delgado as a major influence in acting. As a teen, Geisler was paired with several loveteams, most notably with ex-girlfriend Jodi Sta Maria in the hit youth-oriented TV series Tabing Ilog.

In 2007, Geisler joined Pinoy Big Brother: Celebrity Edition 2 along with older brother Donnie. In 2009, after winning multiple acting awards from television and the independent circuit, Geisler has considered changing network from ABS-CBN to GMA Network after being offered to be a part of SRO Cinemaserye of GMA. Yet, he remained a freelance actor appearing to both networks. Geisler is currently a part of ALV Talent Circuit, Inc.

In 2014, Geisler starred in an independent film titled Waves co-starring Polish-American model Ilona Struzik. Geisler was part of the fantasy series Dyesebel in the same year with Anne Curtis, Sam Milby, and Gerald Anderson where he played one of the villains, the devious Kanor de la Paz. He was also part the 1st Batch of Lucky Stars in Kapamilya Deal or No Deal.

In 2017, Geisler made his theater debut as Tikbalang/Amerikano in Tanghalang Pilipino's rock sarswela “Aurelio Sedisyoso".

In May 2019, after going in sabbatical for alcohol dependence recovery in Cebu, Geisler returned to acting via FPJ's Ang Probinsyano in a critically acclaimed performance where he played one of the show's villains. He previously starred himself in a special participation role in 2015.

Personal life
An art enthusiast, Geisler has a wide variety of tattoos on his body. Geisler is also a practitioner of taekwondo, influenced by his Olympian brother Donnie. In 2006, Geisler underwent SmartLipo procedure under the Belo Medical Group of Dr. Vicki Belo.

Aside from former Tabing Ilog co-star Jodi Sta. Maria, Geisler's also known to have had past relationships with other celebrities such as Kristine Hermosa, Matet de Leon, Tara Tambunting, Dionne Monsanto and Cai Cortez (daughter of veteran actor Rez Cortez). In 2009, Geisler had a relationship with Filipino-Australian Rachel Stephenson. Geisler was also in a relationship with theater actress Raflesia Chiarra "Raf" Bravo but the couple split following Geisler's 2017 arrest, with Geisler initiating the split inside the detention facility. In April 2019, Geisler announced that he is engaged to his psychologist girlfriend Jamie Marie Evangelista, a single mother who is based in Cebu City. The two were in a relationship since September 2018. Geisler officially proposed to her in July 2019. The two married on September 12, 2019 in a civil wedding at Quezon City Hall. The two welcomed their baby girl in January 2020 whom they named Talitha Cumi.

Geisler's mother, Gracia Bayonito-Geisler, died of cancer-related complications on January 22, 2017, at the age of 60.

In 2018, Geisler joined Maranatha Christian Fellowship, a "Bible-based, spirit-led congregation" in Cebu, and speaking about mental health awareness at various symposiums.

During one of his guestings in Magandang Buhay talk show in July 2019, Geisler revealed that he previously used illegal drugs in the course of his alcoholism.

In September 2019, initial reports surfaced online saying that Geisler was conferred to the title of peace and prosperity ambassador by Mohammadmamay Hasan Abdurajak (aka Raja Mamay) and Maria Makiling Helen Fatima Nasaria Panolino Abdurajak (aka Queen Hellen) allegedly from the Royal Sultanate of Sulu and North Borneo making Geisler a Datu of Sulu, but it was later confirmed officially by the Royal House of Sulu’s Chancellery that both Hasan and Helen Abdurajak are “commoners with no royal blood” and are “not even recognized by the Philippine government as one of the claimants to the Sultanate of Sulu”.

On September 14, 2019, Geisler revealed that he is pursuing a degree in AB Theology through a modular course. He finished the said degree in 2022, graduating from college.

Geisler has been residing in Cebu since he got married. In 2020, Geisler revealed that he has enlisted himself to be a Navy reservist. He will be training under the Philippine Navy in Cebu City.

Controversies

Public persona and criticism
Geisler is one of the most controversial actors in his generation. During the early 2000s, while his performance as an actor was going stellar, his career on the other hand went lagging. He has confessed to being addicted to alcohol after his father's demise and his own break-up with actress Jodi Sta. Maria. Geisler's family house has also been razed by fire twice and he himself has been involved in numerous brawls. One of the said brawls was a bar scuffle, in fact, left him with two visible scars on his left cheek. His own mother, Gracia Bayonito-Geisler, eventually signed him up in a detox facility (for 10 days) thus helping him earn the nickname as the "Wild Child" of Pinoy Big Brother: Celebrity Edition 2 and tagged as the modern day "Bad Boy" in Philippine showbiz.

Lasciviousness allegations
In 2008, Geisler faced a lawsuit against fellow former Pinoy Big Brother housemate Yayo Aguila's daughter Patrizha, accusing him of an alleged act of lasciviousness while he was drunk in which Geisler has denied engaging. Martinez's camp alleged that Geisler touched her breasts and made indecent proposals in a restobar. The case was on-going as Geisler appeared in several TV series projects such as Eva Fonda, Tayong Dalawa ("The Two of Us"), The Wedding, among others. Geisler also faced a lawsuit filed by actress Yasmien Kurdi for another alleged sexual-related case on the same year.

Geisler was later found guilty in 2013 against Patrizha Martinez and was fined with damages and community service and was sentenced to probation.

Indefinite artist ban
In early 2011, Geisler faced a malicious complaint from actress Cherry Pie Picache who accused him for groping her breast on the set of Noah in which Geisler has denied engaging and claimed it was just an accidental touch. It was reported that Geisler was under the influence of alcohol on that taping day. This was Geisler's fourth acts of lasciviousness/unjust vexation accusation, the other three are with Patrizha Martinez, Yasmien Kurdi and Julia Clarete, respectively.

It was later confirmed by Geisler's manager, Arnold Vegafria, that Geisler immediately made a public apology statement in the presence of Picache right after the incident and voluntarily entered rehabilitation in a 90-day treatment session. The Professional Artist Management, Inc. (PAMI) stated that Geisler will be on an indefinite artist ban which prohibits artists and talents whose managers are PAMI-members from working with Geisler unless he could complete his 90-day treatment session and be fully rehabilitated. Geisler's alcohol rehabilitation started on January 30, 2011 and as per confirmation by the rehab center, had successfully completed.

After finishing rehab, Geisler and Yasmien Kurdi reconciled resulting in Kurdi withdrawing the case filed against him. Upon his return to acting, Geisler played Erning Toothpick (a character originally played by actor Paquito Diaz based on its real life counterpart, Ernesto Reyes) in the 2011 Metro Manila Film Festival entry of Viva Films, Manila Kingpin: The Asiong Salonga Story top-billed by Laguna Governor Jeorge "ER" Ejercito Estregan.

Bouncer altercation
In mid 2015, Geisler's video of alleged altercation with a bouncer at a bar in Angeles City went viral in social media. Reports say that Geisler got frustrated and challenged the bouncers to a fist fight after being denied entry at the said bar due to alcohol intoxication.

Khalil Versoza
On May 15, 2016, a video which was originally posted through Facebook by a University of the Philippines filmmaking student Khalil Versoza showing Geisler berating and allegedly hurting a fellow student went viral. According to Verzosa, they hired Geisler for a school project. Furthermore, he stated that Geisler went berserk over the use of an idiot board — a board where dialogue is written for actors to read. In the accompanying caption, Verzosa explained that they were only able to send Geisler the script on the morning of the day of the shoot because, as students, they had to attend to other matters. While Geisler received numerous bashes from netizens, some also questioned the legitimacy of the video as "scripted" and others call it a "social experiment". Geisler issued a statement on the following day saying that the video was "taken out of context" and that whatever the intention of the uploader was, it was "meant to exploit his already damaged reputation". Geisler further said he will consult his lawyers what legal action to take on the video uploader.

On May 18, Verzosa said that he and Geisler have talked to each other over the matter. Verzosa revealed that the video they were shooting was focused on Republic Act No. 9262, a law to counter violence against women and children with Geisler's previous court cases involving women as its inspiration. Verzosa added that the reason behind for uploading the video was that as an anti-violence advocate himself, "he initially thought it was his form of justice and awareness raising" and that the "harsh comments and negative reactions" from the netizens towards Geisler are "different" from what he expected. Verzosa and Geisler made amends since and eventually talked over the possibility of shooting an "anti-rape advocacy video" sometime in the future which both are open with. Verzosa took down the video and urged netizens to stop sharing the video. Geisler then posted a message for critics who alleged that he is under the influence of drugs by challenging them to let him take a random drug test as he is willing to take a test any day and that if the result is negative, those critics would have to "pay" him.

Kiko Matos
On May 25, 2016, another video of Geisler went viral through Facebook showing him and independent film actor Kiko Matos on a bar fight in Tomas Morato, Quezon City. According to a witness' testimony about the incident via Facebook, Geisler was "only protective" of the bartender whom Matos was allegedly badmouthing because his company's cocktail drink order was taking time to be served. Geisler was asking the alleged impatient Matos to "lower his voice down" because he's not the only person at the bar. However, Matos was hardened by his comment, telling him to "mind his own business" and lambasted him with foul language. Geisler also responded with reproach, but he also reportedly shoved a stool and flung it on Matos. Additionally, the band performing that night had tried to settle a truce between the two. Geisler appears to have yielded by offering a handshake, but before he could even reach his hand, Matos grabbed him by the arm and punched him several times. Matos later denied that he disrespected the bartender. On a May 29 interview, Matos said that it was Geisler who has started the fight by insisting on jamming with the band which turned out to be a fund-raising concert for a political detainee. He said that Geisler got irked and hurled insults at him and his company just for asking to step down from the stage.  Universal Reality Combat Championship, a Philippine-based mixed martial arts company, announced that the two actors will fight in a special exhibition match set on June 25, 2016 at the Valkyrie at The Palace, Taguig to settle the feud between them. The two-round match concluded in a unanimous draw.  Post-match, the two actors immediately reconciled over their earlier bouts including the bar scuffle. Geisler commended Matos for their fight despite having had their scores tied admitting he deserved victory. Geisler said of Matos, "I believe we respect each other as actors and as human beings." It was later revealed that the series of events were documented as part of a documentary film called Beastmode starred by Geisler and Matos themselves, however Geisler denied that the URCC fight was scripted.

Ping Medina
In late November 2016, it was reported that Geisler had been involved in an altercation with fellow actor Ping Medina. Medina released a lengthy Facebook post with a photo of himself, sitting on a wheelchair and his middle finger aloft using his broken hand wrapped in bandages as a gesture of contempt against Geisler in the wake of the incident. According to his post, Geisler urinated on him during a shoot of an independent film in Subic wherein Medina's hands and feet were tied and his mouth was taped in a certain scene. Geisler issued an apology about the incident later on, admitting that he had been drinking and was heavily medicated with anti-depressants while filming. The same day, the film's director, Arlyn Dela Cruz, confirmed on her Facebook account that Geisler's role had been "written out" for the incident; she disclosed that some actors initially advised her not to work with Geisler, due to his "unruly behavior". In December 2016, Dela Cruz also confirmed that she would be replacing Medina with an unnamed actor in hopes that she could bring back the "happy atmosphere" on the set of her film. Geisler was then banned again by PAMI prohibiting him from working with PAMI-associated actors and filmmakers, until the decision was lifted in late 2017. In 2020, Geisler stated in a Twitter response that Medina raped a former girlfriend of his citing it as the reason he urinated on him after rape allegations against Medina surfaced from a certain Twitter user in the same year. Geisler had previously accused Medina with the same allegations back in 2016 after the incident between them. Medina has not answered Geisler's accusations.

Legal troubles

Raymundo dela Rosa
Geisler was temporarily detained for physical assault to his neighbor and store owner named Raymundo dela Rosa on November 9, 2012. He was released less than 24 hours after a mutual settlement from both parties as the file was withdrawn by dela Rosa. Geisler claimed that the incident was just for self-defense purposes. It was also later found out that Geisler was intoxicated that time.

Geisler later stated in an interview that he was struggling from an extreme bipolar disorder and was under a strict medication for the said illness.

Car accident
On September 15, 2015, Geisler was involved in a car accident but left unhurt. Geisler's SUV crashed with a 16-wheeler truck in Pasig before dawn. Geisler was presumably under the influence of alcohol according to early reports. Geisler's vehicle and the truck were brought to the Pasig traffic bureau as the investigation continued to determine who was at fault. According to a report from DZMM posted on the ABS-CBN website, the Traffic Division of Pasig said that Geisler was driving his car after his taping when he got into an accident with the truck. No one was hurt but according to Geisler, his companion during the clash suffered minor injuries.

2017 restobar arrest
Geisler was arrested in October 2017 for alleged violent behavior in a resto-bar located along Tomas Morato Avenue in Quezon City after allegedly shouting and going amok at customers and staff members. Geisler insisted he did not cause trouble at the bar and accused the police of not following due process in arresting him. Geisler was charged with unjust vexation and alarm & scandal by the bar owner. Prior to the incident, Geisler also had a standing arrest warrant issued in Cebu for smoking inside a plane which violates the Civil Aviation Authority Act. Geisler was released after a week.

Brother-in-law altercation and arrest
On March 3, 2018, Geisler posted a photo of his bruised face on his Instagram account, accusing a family member of beating him up due to financial matters. It was revealed that he got into a physical altercation with his brother in law Michael Robinstone Rodriguez Morales, husband of elder sister Grace Geisler-Morales, after allegedly displaying unruly intoxicated behavior inside Morales's house in Angeles City. According to Morales, he went to Geisler's house and confronted him about allegedly badmouthing his daughter (Geisler's niece) earlier on that day. Morales added that he was provoked by Geisler which resulted in a scuffle. Morales also posted a photo of their house being vandalized by Geisler.

On March 5, 2018, Geisler was arrested after he allegedly "threatened to kill" Morales. Geisler faced charges of grave threat, alarm and scandal, and possession of a bladed weapon outside of Morales's residence in Angeles City. Charges were filed against Geisler before the City Prosecutor's Office.

It was later revealed that Geisler decided to enter alcohol addiction rehab for the second time after his release from detention with his brother-in-law withdrawing the case.

Business venture 
During his time in Cebu where he took his alcohol rehabilitation in 2019, Geisler sold his property including his car to open up Gents Barber, a barber shop located in Gaisano Country Mall, Cebu City that employs recovering addicts and alcoholics.

Filmography

Television

Film

References

External links

 

1982 births
Living people
Bicolano people
Bicolano actors
People from Parañaque
Filipino people of German descent
People from Angeles City
Male actors from Pampanga
Kapampangan people
Filipino male child actors
Filipino male television actors
Filipino male film actors
Filipino male comedians
ABS-CBN personalities
Star Magic
Participants in Philippine reality television series
Pinoy Big Brother contestants
GMA Network personalities
TV5 (Philippine TV network) personalities